Changeover is a New Zealand Standardbred racehorse and stud stallion.

She was owned by the Auckland Trotting Club Trot 2006 Syndicate.

Racing career

He was at one time New Zealand's second highest earning pacer ever with over $2.4 million.  He is most noted for winning the New Zealand Trotting Cup in 2008, when he posted a then race record time of 3:56.4 for the 3200m.  He won the Cup by almost 2 lengths from Baileys Dream and Report For Duty.

His other achievements include winning:

 the 2007 Great Northern Derby beating Lombo Pocket Watch and Days Of Courage.
 the 2007 New Zealand Derby from Gotta Go Cullen and Montecito. 
 the 2007 Harness Jewels 3YO Emerald at Ashburton from Mr Molly and Gotta Go Cullen.
 the 2007 Superstars 4YO championship at Addington from Running Outa Excuses and Keytoourdreams.
 the 2008 Harness Jewels 4YO Emerald at Cambridge from Gotta Go Cullen and Chilli. 
 the 2008 Noel J Taylor Mile from Gotta Go Cullen and Mr Molly. 
 the 2009 Len Smith Mile at Menangle Park Paceway in Australia, beating Smoken Up and Our Awesome Armbro. He returned a positive swab after the Len Smith Mile, but that was overturned on appeal.
 the 2010 Waikato Flying Mile, beating Trigirl Brigade and Pembrooke Benny.

Changeover was also first past the post in the New Zealand Sires Stakes 3yo Championship before being disqualified for a positive swab

Changeover was also placed:
 4th in the 2007 New Zealand Trotting Cup behind Flashing Red, Monkey King and Tribute.
 3rd in the 2008 New Zealand Free For All behind Auckland Reactor and Awesome Ambro.
 2nd in the 2008 New Zealand Messenger behind Gotta Go Cullen. with Victory Spirit 3rd.
 3rd in the 2009 Franklin Cup behind Rider On The Storm and Power Of Tara.
 3rd in the 2009 New Zealand Free For All behind Monkey King and Nearea Franco, with Mr Feelgood 4th.

Changeover competed in two Inter Dominion Pacing Championship:

 4th in the 2009 Grand final at Albion Park behind Mr Feelgood, Blacks A Fake and Karloo Mick.
 4th in the 2010 Grand final at Menangle behind Blacks A Fake, Monkey King and Smoken Up.

Changeover was generally driven by David Butcher and occasionally Geoff Small. Peter Davis also drove him to a win at Addington Raceway as a 2 year old.

He was retired in March 2010 after running 5th in the 2010 Auckland Cup, behind Monkey King, Tintin In America, Baileys Dream and Bondy.

Stud career

Changeover has sired over 100 individual winners, including:
 Run Oneover (Western Australia, 1:50.8; $554,998).
 Sudden Change (1:51.4) 
 Dizzy Miss Lizzy (New Zealand 1:52), winner of the 2017 $150,000 Group One Diamond Jewels for 2YO Fillies.
 The Mustang (1:49.3)

In the 2020 season Changeover stood at Burwood Stud in Queensland for a service fee of $1,650 plus GST.

See also

 Harness racing in New Zealand

References

New Zealand standardbred racehorses
New Zealand Trotting Cup winners
Harness racing in New Zealand
2003 racehorse births